Tania Cerda Meseguer (born September 30, 1977, in Badalona) is a female S9 swimmer from Spain. She competed at the 1992 and 1996 Summer Paralympics, winning a bronze medal in the 4 x 100 meter Relay 34 Points race consecutively. She also competed at the 2000 Summer Paralympics in Sydney, Australia.

References 

1982 births
Living people
Spanish female freestyle swimmers
Spanish female backstroke swimmers
Paralympic bronze medalists for Spain
Swimmers at the 2000 Summer Paralympics
Swimmers at the 1996 Summer Paralympics
Swimmers at the 1992 Summer Paralympics
People from Badalona
Sportspeople from the Province of Barcelona
Paralympic medalists in swimming
Medalists at the 1992 Summer Paralympics
Medalists at the 1996 Summer Paralympics
Paralympic swimmers of Spain
S9-classified Paralympic swimmers